Pleospora theae is a plant pathogen infecting tea.

References

Fungal plant pathogens and diseases
Tea diseases
Fungi described in 1904
Pleosporaceae